A Arma Escarlate (English: The Scarlet Weapon) is a 2011 fantasy novel by Brazilian author Renata Ventura and published by Novo Século. The book follows Hugo Escarlate, a boy raised at Favela Santa Marta, Rio de Janeiro, who discovers he is a wizard.

Synopsis 
The year is 1997, in the middle of an intense shootout, during one of the bloodiest eras of the Favela Santa Marta, a thirteen-years-old boy discovers he is a wizard.

Sworn death by drug kingpins, Hugo escapes with only one goal in mind: learn enough magic to come back and confront the bandit who is threatening his family. In this learning process, however, he may end up discovering how much of bandit's is inside himself.

Reception 
A Arma Escarlate received 4.6/5 rate at Skoob, based on 1011 evaluations. The book is being highly praised among the youth and also the adults for using fantasy to deal with hard themes of Brazilian reality, as social inequality, prejudice, abandonment, drugs and corruption. In a short release time, it became successful between a great youth community widespread in Brazil. A Arma Escarlate has currently about ten thousands likes on Facebook. On April 27, 2013, it was nominated for Codex de Ouro in Fantasy genre, winning the award.

References

External links 
 "A Arma Escarlate" Official Website
 Article on 'O Globo' about A Arma Escarlate

2011 novels
Brazilian romance novels
Brazilian fantasy novels